Koichi Uehara (born 25 November 1947) is a Japanese professional golfer.

Uehara played on the Japan Golf Tour, winning seven times.

Professional wins (11)

Japan Golf Tour wins (7)
1977 Hokkaido Open
1978 Hokkaido Open, Sanpo Classic
1980 Hokkaido Open
1982 Hokkaido Open
1984 Hokkaido Open, Japan Open Golf Championship

Other wins (4)
1976 Hokkaido Open
1979 Niigata Open
1993 Hokkaido Open
2000 Hokkaido Open

References

External links

Japanese male golfers
Japan Golf Tour golfers
Sportspeople from Shizuoka Prefecture
1947 births
Living people